Red, Hot and Blue may refer to:

 Red, Hot and Blue, a 1936 Cole Porter musical
 Red Hot + Blue, a compilation music album
 Redhot & Blue (musical group), a Yale University a cappella group
 Red Hot & Blue (Lee Atwater recording project), 1990
 Red Hot & Blue (restaurant), an American barbecue restaurant franchise
 Red, Hot and Blue (film), a 1949 musical comedy film

See also
 ''The Red Hot Blues of Phil Guy, a 1982 album